Pace Brantley Preparatory, formerly known as PACE-Brantley Hall School, is a private school in Longwood, Florida specializing in teaching students with attention-deficit hyperactivity disorder, obsessive–compulsive disorder, attention deficit disorder, dyslexia, Asperger syndrome, and other learning disabilities.

History
Pace Brantley School was founded in 1972 by Mary E. Dunn, an advocate in assisting the learning of students with disabilities. At first, the school had seven students and two teachers, and it met in a church on weekdays. Since then, the school has grown to a wooded,  campus with eight buildings. In 2022,  the school changed its name to Pace Brantley Preparatory to reflect the work being done to prepare for postsecondary education and workforce development.

Student Admissions and Programs
The school enrolls students in second through twelfth grade.
Tuition fees for elementary and middle school students is $13,385, and for high school, $13,885.
Students can participate in physical education programs in which they learn about and play sports including basketball, baseball, softball, dodgeball, kickball, field hockey, as well as other sports.
The school has two fully enhanced playgrounds for elementary school and middle school students. Also, students can participate in a wide range of after-school activities such as intramural sports, drama classes, music lessons, and clubs.

Learning programs
Pace Brantley Preparatory can assist students with particular learning disabilities with Wilson reading, Orton-Gillingham, Fast ForWord, Feuerstein's Instrumental Enrichment, and other programs, including youth leadership, speech therapy, and occupational therapy.

Morning and after-care services
Early (before school) care services are available from 7:15 AM to 8:15 AM, when students are dismissed to their homerooms. Students can work on homework assignments or study during this period.

After-care services are available from 3:45 PM (2:45 on Wednesdays) to 5:30 PM. Like early care, students are allowed to do homework assignments and study during this period.

References

Educational institutions established in 1972
Private elementary schools in Florida
High schools in Seminole County, Florida
Private middle schools in Florida
Private high schools in Florida
Longwood, Florida